Curtin University bus station is a Transperth bus station located at Curtin University's Bentley campus. It has eight stands and is served by 11 Transperth routes operated by Path Transit and Swan Transit.

History
Curtin University bus station opened on 17 November 1999.

Bus routes

References

Bus stations in Perth, Western Australia